David Downton (born 18 February 1959) is an English fashion illustrator. He worked for Vogue.

Biography
David Downton was born in Kent, England in 1959. He studied at Canterbury (Foundation year 1977–1978) and Wolverhampton (BA hons illustration/graphics 1979–1981).

In 1984 he moved to Brighton and began his illustration career. He has worked on a wide variety of projects, including advertising, packaging, illustrating fiction, cook books, and, occasionally, fashion. His drawings from fashion shows have been published internationally.

In 2007, Downton launched Pourquoi Pas?, a journal of fashion illustration. He is a visiting professor at London College of Fashion.

He received an honorary doctorate from the Academy of Art University, San Francisco, in April 2009.

Downton is the artist in residence at London's Claridge's hotel, where he stays 52 nights a year in exchange for drawings.

References

External links
 David Downton’s web site
 David Downton’s blog at Vogue.com UK
 Amelia’s Magazine, Interview with David Downton

1959 births
Fashion illustrators
British illustrators
Living people
People from Kent
People from Brighton
Alumni of the University of Wolverhampton